This article is a list of all current automobile manufacturers of the United States.

Current manufacturers

Big Three 
The currently active brands from the "Big Three" manufacturers (Ford, General Motors and Stellantis) are shown below.

Major EV Companies 
Lucid Motors (2007–present) 
Tesla (2003–present)
Rivian Automotive, Inc. (2009-present)

Other companies 

AC Propulsion (1992–present)
AM General (1971–present)
Anteros Coachworks (2005–present)
Aptera Motors (2005–present)
Arcimoto (2007–present)
Aria Group (2017–present)
Aurica Motors(2010–present) 
Alpha Motor Corporation (2020–present)
AlloyCars Aluminum Automobiles (1996–present)
Bauer Limited Production (2012–present)
Berrien Buggy (1968–present)
Brammo (2002–present)
Bollinger Motors (2014–present)
Bremach (2009–present)
BXR Motors (2008–present)
Callaway Cars (1977–present)
Canoo (2017–present)
Cizeta Automobili (1988–present)
Commuter Cars (2004–present)
Cord (1929–1937, 2017–present)
Czinger (2019–present)
Cruise Automation (2013–present)
DDR Motorsport (2001–present)
Deco Rides (2000–present)
DF Kit Cars (1993–present)
Dio Cars (1991–present)
Dove Racing (2008–present)
Dragon Motor Cars (2002–present)
Drako Motors (2013–present)
Drakan Motor Cars (2015–present)
DeLorean Motor Company (Texas) (1995–present)
Detroit Electric (1907–1939, 2008–present)
Elation Motors (2014–present)
Elio Motors (2009–present)
Equus Automotive (2013–present)
Everett-Morrison Motorcars (1983–present)
Exotic Rides (2014–present) 
Exomotive (2011–present)
Falcon Motorsports (2009–present)
Faraday Future(2014–present)
Factory Five Racing (1995–present)
Fisker Inc (2015–present)
Gagliardi Design (2003–present)
Global Electric Motorcars (1998–present)
Hennessey Special Vehicles (2017–present)
Hyperion Motors (2011–present)
Karma Automotive (2016–present)
Kepler Motors (2009–present)
Laffite Supercars (2015–present)
Local Motors (2007–present)
Lordstown Motors (2019–present)
Lucra Cars (2006–present)
Lyons Motor Car (2011–present)
Meyers Manx (1964–present)
Mullen Technologies (2014–present)
Next Autoworks (2006–present)
Myers Motors (2004–present)
N2A Motors (2004–present)
Niama-Reisser (2005–present)
Nikola Corporation (2014–present)
Palatov Motorsport (2008–present)
Panoz (1989–present)
Polaris Inc (1954–present)

RAESR (2014–present)
Ronn Motor Group (2007–present)
Rossion-Mosler Automotive (1985–present)
Rezvani Automotive Designs (2014–present)
Rush Auto Works (2017–present)
Saleen Automotive (1983–present)
Scarab-Motorsports LLC (2006–present)
Scuderia Cameron Glickenhaus (2010–present)
Shelby American (1992–present)
Simpson Design (1978–present)
SSC North America (1999–present)

Superformance (1996–present)
Superlite Cars (2007–present)
Tanom Motors  (2010–present)
Transtar Racing (2010–present)
Trion Supercars (2012–present)
United Motorcar Company (2009–present)
Valarra (2019–present)
Vanderhall Motor Works (2010–present)
Vaydor (2013–present)
Vector Motors (1971–present)
Vetter Vehicles (unknown–present)
VIA Motors (2010–present)
Visionary Vehicles (2002–present)
VLF Automotive (2012–present)
Waymo (2009–present)
Wheego Technologies (2009–present)
Workhorse Group (1998–present)
Zimmer Motorcars (1978-1988, 1997–present)

Defunct manufacturers

See also
Automotive industry in the United States
List of automobile manufacturers
List of car brands

Bibliography 
 
 
  
  

Lists of automobile manufacturers
Automobile